Nikhil "Nik" Deogun is an Indian-born American journalist, and the former managing editor of CNBC. Prior to joining CNBC in 2010, Deogun was the deputy managing editor at The Wall Street Journal.

Education
Deogun was born in Assam, India, and completed his schooling at The Doon School in Dehradun. After leaving Doon in 1987, he went to Muskingum University for a bachelor's degree in economics and English, followed by a master's degree in journalism from University of Missouri, graduating in 1993.

Career
In 1994, Deogun got his first job as a staff reporter at the Atlanta bureau of The Wall Street Journal, and then moved to the paper's New York City bureau in 1999. He remained at WSJ for 15 years and later became the paper's deputy managing editor. In 2010, he joined CNBC as editor-in-chief of business news programming, and a year later was appointed the senior vice president of the channel. In October 2018, Deogun left CNBC to become the CEO of the Americas at Brunswick Group, a corporate advisory firm.

References

External links
 Nikhil Deogun's CNBC Profile
 Brunswick Group profile

 

CNBC people
The Doon School alumni
Muskingum University alumni
American reporters and correspondents
Living people
The Wall Street Journal people
University of Missouri alumni
American male journalists
American writers of Indian descent
21st-century American newspaper editors
American business and financial journalists

Year of birth missing (living people)